The NAIA Women's Volleyball National Championship is the annual tournament to determine the national champions of NAIA women's collegiate indoor volleyball in the United States and Canada. It has been held annually since 1980.

The most successful program was BYU–Hawaii, with 10 NAIA national titles (BYUH subsequently joined the NCAA and discontinued sports in 2017).

The current champions are Missouri Baptist, who won its first national title in 2020 and repeated as champions in 2021.

Results

Summary

 Schools highlighted in pink are closed or no longer sponsor athletics.
 Schools highlight in yellow have reclassified athletics from the NAIA.

See also
NAIA Men's Volleyball Championship
NCAA Women's Volleyball Championships (Division I, Division II, Division III)

References

External links
NAIA website
NAIA Volleyball Championship Results Archives

V
Volleyball competitions in the United States
NAIA national women's vol